Miss Robinson Crusoe is a 1917 silent American comedy-drama film, directed by Christy Cabanne. It stars Emmy Wehlen, Walter C. Miller, and Harold Entwistle, and was released on July 30, 1917.

Cast list
 Emmy Wehlen as Pamela Sayre
 Walter Miller as Bertie Holden (*as Walter C. Miller)
 Harold Entwistle as Charles Van Gordon
 Sue Balfour as Aunt Agatha
 Margaret Seddon as Aunt Eloise
 Augustus Phillips as Bertini
 Daniel Jarrett as Van Hoffman
 Ethel Hallor

References

External links

 poster

Films directed by Christy Cabanne
American silent feature films
Metro Pictures films
American black-and-white films
1910s English-language films
1917 comedy-drama films
1917 films
Films produced by B. A. Rolfe
1910s American films
Silent American comedy-drama films